Peter Kotuľa (born 11 March 1982 in Bratislava, Slovakia) is a Slovak musician and an artist. He was in the finals of Slovensko hľadá SuperStar ("Slovakia is searching for a SuperStar") in 2005, and immediately following released a very successful album entitled Poď so mnou on Sony BMG. He also tried unsuccessfully to represent Slovakia in Eurovision Song Contest 2009 with the song "Cesty sú stratené"

Discography

Albums
 2005:  Poď so mnou (on Sony BMG)

Tracks:
Bláznivá jazda
Je to o tebe
Amor nedochví¾ny
Hlavu strácam
Tak ako
Nestra svoju tvár
Keï sníva Boh
Poï so mnou
Business Man
Párty
Nádej
Tak ako (Orchestra mix)

Singles
"Tak ako" (feat. Tina) 
"Je to o tebe" 
"Cesty su stratene"
featured in
"Len s tebou sa dá" (Lobo Ismail feat. Peter Kotuľa)

Collaborations
Peter Kotuľa has collaborated with a number of artists
He has a duo with Tina in "Tak Ako"
He is featured as a duo with Lobo Ismail in "Len S Tebou Sa Dá"
He contributed with the track "Scifi žena" in rapper DNA's 2010 album Revolucionár. The track was produced by Palio

See also
 The 100 Greatest Slovak Albums of All Time

References

External links 
 Peter Kotuľa Official site
 Peter Kotuľa Last FM page

1982 births
Living people
21st-century Slovak male singers